Aralluy, also rendered as Arallu, may refer to:
Aralluy-e Bozorg, "Greater Aralluy", a village in Ardabil Province, Iran
Aralluy-e Kuchek, "Lesser Aralluy", a village in Ardabil Province, Iran